GHS may refer to:

Education 
 Gaithersburg High School, Gaithersburg, Maryland, US
 Glendora High School, a school in Glendora, Los Angeles, US
 Glenunga International High School, formerly Glenunga High School, a school in Adelaide, South Australia
 Gloucester High School (Virginia), a school in Gloucester, Virginia, US
 Grafton High School (disambiguation), several schools
 Greenwich High School, Greenwich, Connecticut, US
 Greenwood High School (disambiguation), several schools
 Guam High School (disambiguation), several schools
 Gulf Harbour School, Whangaparaoa, Auckland, New Zealand

Healthcare 
 Geisinger Health System,  Pennsylvania, US
 Ghana Health Service
 Global Health Security Index

Other uses 
 GHS (strings), a US guitar string manufacturer
 General Household Survey, UK
 Georgia Historical Society, US
 Ghanaian cedi, currency
 Globally Harmonized System of Classification and Labelling of Chemicals
 Growth hormone secretagogue